A polymer is a large molecule composed of many repeating subunits.

Polymer or Polymers may also refer to:
 Polymer, a 2012 album by American rapper Tonedeff
 Polymer (album), a 2019 album by British electronic duo Plaid
 Polymer (journal), an academic journal published by Elsevier
 Polymers (journal), an academic journal published by MDPI
 Polymer (library), a JavaScript library for building web applications

See also
 Polimer TV, a Tamil-language satellite television channel based in Chennai, India